Giorgi Asanidze (born 30 August 1975 in Sachkhere) is a former Georgian weightlifter, Olympic Champion, World Champion, and three time European Champion who competed in the 85 kg and 77 kg categories.

Career

Weightlifting
He competed at the 2000 Summer Olympics where he won a bronze medal (all three medalists had the same total of 390 kg, but the medals were determined by lowest body weight), and the 2004 Summer Olympics where he won gold.

He is currently the coach for the Georgian National Weightlifting Team, including European medalist Goga Chkheidze, European champion Shota Mishvelidze, Olympic bronze medalist Anton Pliesnoi, and two-time Olympic champion Lasha Talakhadze.

Government
He was elected to the Parliament of Georgia from the United National Movement in 2004. He was reelected in the May 2008 Parliamentary election from Tbilisi’s Gldani constituency on the same party ticket.

Major results

Career bests 
 Snatch: 181 kg
 Clean and jerk: 210 kg
 Total: 391 kg 2000 European Championship in the class to 85 kg.

References

External links
 
 

1975 births
Living people
People from Sachkhere
Male weightlifters from Georgia (country)
Olympic weightlifters of Georgia (country)
Olympic gold medalists for Georgia (country)
Olympic bronze medalists for Georgia (country)
Olympic medalists in weightlifting
Weightlifters at the 2000 Summer Olympics
Weightlifters at the 2004 Summer Olympics
Medalists at the 2004 Summer Olympics
Members of the Parliament of Georgia
United National Movement (Georgia) politicians
Recipients of the Presidential Order of Excellence
European Weightlifting Championships medalists
World Weightlifting Championships medalists